The Dallas Pedestrian Network or Dallas Pedway is a system of grade-separated walkways covering thirty-six city blocks of Downtown Dallas, Texas, United States. The system connects buildings, garages and parks through tunnels and above-ground skybridges. The network contains an underground city of shops, restaurants and offices during weekday business hours.

The underground network was the idea of Montreal urban planner Vincent Ponte, who was also responsible for  Montreal's Underground City.

Connected to the Dallas Pedestrian Network

Hotels:
 Sheraton Dallas Hotel
 Fairmont Hotel
 Dallas Marriott Downtown
 Hotel Indigo
 Crowne Plaza Dallas Downtown
 Westin
 Cambria Dallas Downtown (Tower Petroleum Building)

Office Buildings:
 Comerica Bank Tower
 Chase Tower
 1700 Pacific
 Bank of America Plaza
 Renaissance Tower
 Fountain Place
 Plaza of the Americas
 Bryan Tower
 KPMG Centre
 Patriot Tower
 Energy Plaza
 Ross Tower
 One Main Place
 Republic Center
 Pacific Place
 1600 Pacific Tower
 The Drever

Parks
 Cancer Survivors Plaza
 Thanks-Giving Square

Residential Buildings
 Titche-Goettinger Building
 Gables Republic
 1900 Pacific Residences (Corrigan Tower)
 1505 Elm

Other
 First Baptist Church
 Universities Center at Dallas
 Majestic Garage
 Elm Street Garage
 Metropolitan Garage

Changing attitudes
In 2005, then-mayor Laura Miller told the New York Times the system of tunnels was "the worst urban planning decision that Dallas has ever made... if I could take a cement mixer and pour cement in and clog up the tunnels, I would do it today".

The Dallas Pedestrian Network is targeted for de-emphasis by the Downtown Dallas 360 initiative, in an effort to bring more focus on street-level activity.  While initial plans had called for a more direct shutdown, a report in April 2012 concluded that a series of measures discouraging further growth or unnecessary maintenance of the system were all that were called for; Downtown Dallas Inc. CEO John Crawford concluded, "[The underground tunnels] aren't much of an issue anymore."

References

External links
Official Website
Map of Pedestrian System on Google Maps
Photos of Pedestrian Network
https://web.archive.org/web/20110818073906/http://id.erudit.org/revue/uhr/2009/v37/n2/029574ar.pdf "Ultramodern Underground Dallas: Vincent Ponte’s Pedestrian-Way as Systematic Solution to the Declining Downtown" by Charissa N. Terranova
The Dallas Morning News, "Walking the Underground Tunnel"

Buildings and structures in Dallas
Tunnels in Dallas
Underground cities